CHC may refer to:

Health care
 Centro Hospitalar de Coimbra (C.H.C.), a hospital complex in Coimbra, Portugal
 Columbia Health Care
 Community health center
 Community Health Clubs in Africa
 Community health council
 Continuing healthcare

Education
 Calvert Hall College, a Catholic preparatory high school in Maryland, USA
 Chavakachcheri Hindu College, a famous school in the Thenmarachchi region, Jaffna
 Chestnut Hill College - a Catholic college in Philadelphia, PA
 College of the Holy Cross, a college in Worcester, Massachusetts
 Cornwall Hill College, a college in Pretoria, South Africa
 Robert D. Clark Honors College at the University of Oregon in Eugene, Oregon

Politics
 Cooler Heads Coalition, an organisation of self-described scientists who reject the scientific consensus on climate change
 Congressional Hispanic Caucus, in the Congress of the United States
 Croatian Helsinki Committee, a human rights group

Sports
 Colonial Hockey Conference, an NCAA D-III women's hockey conference
 Castrol-Haugg-Cup, a race-like event contested mainly at Nürburgring
 Club de Hockey Canadien, the official French name of the Montreal Canadiens NHL club
 Chicago Cubs, a Major League Baseball team that has this abbreviation for box scores and television scoring displays

Transport
 Charing Cross (Glasgow) railway station's National Rail station code
 Ching Chung stop's MTR station code
 Christchurch International Airport's IATA airport code
 CHC Helicopter, the world's largest global commercial helicopter operator

Other
 Canadian Hurricane Centre
 CHC Theory, Cattell-Horn-Carroll theory of human cognitive abilities
 Chlorinated hydrocarbon (individual substance) and chlorinated hydrocarbons (group of substances)
 City Harvest Church, a local independent megachurch in Singapore
 Conventual Chaplain ad honorem of the Sovereign Military Order of Malta